Chahardahi-ye Asgar (also Romanized as Chahārdahī-ye ‘Asgar; also known as Chahārdahī and Chahārdahī-ye ‘Askar) is a former village in Tashan-e Sharqi Rural District, Tashan District, Behbahan County, Khuzestan Province, Iran. The former villages of Chahardahi-ye Asgar, Ablesh, Chahardahi-ye Sohrab, Deh-e Ebrahim, Masiri & Tall Kohneh came together to create the city of Tashan. At the 2006 census, its population was 195, in 41 families.

References 

Populated places in Behbahan County